Lasiopalpus is a genus of parasitic flies in the family Tachinidae. There are at least three described species in Lasiopalpus.

Species
These three species belong to the genus Lasiopalpus:
 Lasiopalpus albipes Townsend
 Lasiopalpus flavitarsis Macquart, 1847
 Lasiopalpus subalpinus Townsend

References

Further reading

 
 
 
 

Tachinidae
Articles created by Qbugbot